Ştefan Pinciuc (born June 7, 1985) is a Moldovan former swimmer, who specialized in freestyle events. Pinciuc qualified for the  men's 200 m freestyle at the 2004 Summer Olympics in Athens, by clearing a FINA B-standard entry time of 1:54.36 from the Russian Open Championships in Moscow. He challenged seven other swimmers in heat two, including dual citizen Mihail Alexandrov of Bulgaria. He raced to third place in a time of 1:54.56, exactly two tenths of a second (0.20) off his entry time. Pinciuc failed to advance into the semifinals, as he placed forty-ninth overall in the preliminaries.

References

1985 births
Living people
Moldovan male freestyle swimmers
Olympic swimmers of Moldova
Swimmers at the 2004 Summer Olympics
Sportspeople from Chișinău